Boyacá Raza de Campeones is a professional men's cycling team based in Colombia. The team was founded in 2007 and held UCI Continental status in 2015 and 2016.

The disbanded at the end of the 2016 season.

Team roster 
As of 26 December 2015.

Major wins 

2016
 U23 Road Race Championships, Roller Diagama
Stage 6 Vuelta a la Independencia Nacional, Diego Ochoa
 Volta a Portugal do Futuro, Wilson Rodríguez
stage 3, Miguel Eduardo Flórez
stage 4, Roller Diagama

National Champions 

2016
 Colombian U23 Road Race Championship, Roller Diagama

References

UCI Continental Teams (America)
Cycling teams based in Colombia
2015 establishments in Colombia